Hands Across America was a public fundraising event on Sunday, May 25, 1986, when 5 to 6.5 million people held hands for 15 minutes in an attempt to form a continuous human chain across the contiguous United States. The attempt to have a complete line of people across the country failed, although the number of participants would have been sufficient to succeed if they had been spread out over the full length of the planned course. The various gaps in the line between participants were filled using ribbons, ropes, or banners.

Many participants donated $10 each to reserve their place in line. The proceeds were donated to local charities to fight hunger and homelessness and help those in poverty.

The event raised about $15 million for charities after operating costs.

Cities 

 
Cities along the route included the following:
 New York, New York with Brooke Shields as well as Liza Minnelli, Cardinal John O'Connor, Susan Anton, Gregory Hines, and Edward James Olmos, Yoko Ono, and Harry Belafonte anchoring the George Washington Bridge.
 Trenton, New Jersey (with Dionne Warwick, Guy Hutchinson and Tony Danza)
 Philadelphia, Pennsylvania (with Jerry Lewis and Scott Baio)
 Baltimore, Maryland (with Kenny Baker (R2-D2) and Emmanuel Lewis)
 Washington, D.C. (with President Ronald Reagan at the White House and Speaker of the House Tip O'Neill at the United States Capitol)
 Pittsburgh, Pennsylvania (with Fred Rogers and the Pittsburgh Pirates Parrot)
 Youngstown, Ohio (with Michael Jackson)
 Cleveland, Ohio (with David Copperfield)
 Toledo, Ohio (with Jamie Farr)
 Columbus, Ohio (with Michael J. Fox)
 Cincinnati, Ohio (with Chewbacca the Wookiee)
 Indianapolis, Indiana (occurred in the rain, scheduled side-by-side with the Indy 500, which was rained-out that day)
 Champaign, Illinois (with Walter Payton)
 Chebanse, Illinois: A cornfield in central Illinois served as center-point of the nation with 16,000 people in attendance 
 Springfield, Illinois (with 50 Abraham Lincoln impersonators)
 St. Louis, Missouri (with Kathleen Turner under the Gateway Arch)
 Memphis, Tennessee (with 54 Elvis Presley impersonators)
 Little Rock, Arkansas (with Governor Bill Clinton)
 Amarillo, Texas (with Kenny Rogers, Renegade, Lee Greenwood and Tony Dorsett at the Texas-New Mexico border)
 Albuquerque, New Mexico (with Don Johnson)
 Phoenix, Arizona (with Ed Begley, Jr., however desert areas were mostly empty, dotted with one-mile (1.6 km)-long chains of people. Truck drivers sounded their horns during the appointed time.)
 San Bernardino, California (with Bob Seger and Charlene Tilton)
 Santa Monica, California (with George Burns, Jack Youngblood, Dudley Moore, Richard Dreyfuss, and Donna Mills)
 Long Beach, California (with Mickey Mouse, Minnie Mouse, Donald Duck, Goofy, Pluto, Reverend Robert Schuller, Kenny Loggins, Joan Van Ark, John Stamos, Robin Williams, and C-3PO (Anthony Daniels) backed by Papa Doo Run Run.)

The event was conceived and organized by Ken Kragen. Event implementation was through USA for Africa under the direction of Marty Rogol, the founding Executive Director. A theme song, entitled "Hands Across America," was played simultaneously on hundreds of radio stations at 3:00 p.m. Eastern time (noon Pacific time). The song was written by Marc Blatte, John Carney, and Larry Gottlieb, and featured lead vocals by session singers Joe Cerisano and Sandy Farina, and the band Toto. The song peaked at #65 on the Billboard Hot 100 in 1986.

Hands Across America was a project of USA for Africa. USA for Africa produced "We Are the World" and the combined revenues raised by both events raised almost $100 million to fight famine in Africa and hunger and homelessness in the United States.

The date and time chosen for the event inadvertently conflicted with another charity fundraiser, Sport Aid, which was organized by USA for Africa on the same day. Since Hands Across America was much better publicized in the United States, only 4,000 runners participated in New York City for Sport Aid.

Continuity of the chain 

In order to allow the maximum number of people to participate, the path linked major cities and meandered back and forth within the cities. There were sections where the "line" was six to ten people deep. Enough people participated that if an average of all the participants had been taken and spread evenly along the route standing four feet (1.2 m) apart, an unbroken chain across the 48 contiguous states would have been able to be formed.The event aimed to raise money to fight poverty and hunger by literally uniting millions of Americans in a single cause: forming a human chain spanning the continental United States. Together, sponsors and corporations accounted for roughly 2000 miles of the 4125-mile chain.

Legacy 

Hands Across America raised $34 million. According to The New York Times, a net $15 million was distributed after deducting operating costs.

Hands Across America was featured in the video for Michael Jackson's song "Cry".

Hands Across America was featured in the 1992 episode of The Simpsons, "Brother, Can You Spare Two Dimes?" in which Homer Simpson reminisces about the memories sitting on their couch. One such memory is his sitting on the couch while his wife and children, along with the Flanders and Lovejoy families, participate in the event while watching coverage which notes that "except for large gaps in the western states, Hands Across America was a complete success".

The event figures significantly in the plot of the 2019 American horror film Us, directed by Jordan Peele.

Hands Across America also featured in a 2016 episode of the sitcom The Goldbergs.

See also 
 Baltic Way
 Hands Across Britain
 Hands Across Hawthorne

References

Further reading 

 
 USA for Africa's Hands Across America pages
 ABC News: Great Shakes: 'Hands Across America' 20 Years Later
 Time: American Notes Charity, December 1, 1986

Contiguous United States
Charity events in the United States
May 1986 events in the United States
Human chains (politics)